Georges Étienne Louis Damitio (20 May 1924 in Toulouse – 7 September 1994 in Biarritz) was a French high jumper who competed in the 1948 Summer Olympics and in the 1952 Summer Olympics.

References

External links
 
 

1924 births
1994 deaths
Sportspeople from Toulouse
French male high jumpers
Olympic athletes of France
Athletes (track and field) at the 1948 Summer Olympics
Athletes (track and field) at the 1952 Summer Olympics
Mediterranean Games gold medalists for France
Mediterranean Games medalists in athletics
Athletes (track and field) at the 1951 Mediterranean Games
20th-century French people